The IWRF Americas Championship or IWRF Americas Zone Championship is the Americas wheelchair rugby championships that take place every two years between national teams of the  Americas zone. The Americas Championship is a qualifying tournament for the IWRF World Championships and the Paralympic Games.

Canada participated in the IWRF Asia-Oceania Championship in 2007.

Summaries

Championships per nation

Participation details

See also
 Wheelchair Rugby World Championships
 IWRF European Championship
 IWRF Asia-Oceania Championship
 American Championships

References

Americas Championship
Recurring sporting events established in 2009